Couch is a small, unincorporated community in Oregon County, Missouri, United States. It is located six miles south of Alton on Missouri Route A.  The ZIP Code for Couch is 65690.

History
A post office called Couch has been in operation since 1887. The community has the name of George W. Couch, a first settler.

References

Unincorporated communities in Oregon County, Missouri
Unincorporated communities in Missouri